Anomaly is the third solo album by former Kiss guitarist Ace Frehley, released on September 15, 2009. It is his first album of new studio material since 1989's Trouble Walkin'. Frehley produced most of the album himself, with Marti Frederiksen producing the Sweet cover "Fox on the Run". The album was dedicated to Kiss drummer Eric Carr, Pantera guitarist Dimebag Darrell, and Les Paul. The album debuted at number 27 on the Billboard 200, number 20 on the Swedish album chart and number 52 on the German chart.

Marketing 
Frehley's official website and YouTube channel released a promo commercial for the album. In it, a boy is outside a sound studio, telling a girl that he has waited for the new album for over a year. Their uncle, sporting a mullet and a Trouble Walkin' T-shirt, tells them he has waited 20 years. Suddenly, from a thick cloud of smoke, Frehley appears on a Chopper. He makes a hitchhiking-like gesture (referencing the Kiss Meets the Phantom of the Park film, when using his transportation powers), magically giving the trio copies of the CD. He lets out an "Ack!" (another reference to the aforementioned film, in which it was his catch phrase), then rides out.
  
The CD cover folds into a pyramid. Another version of the CD included a temporary tattoo. Anomaly has also been pressed on limited copies of vinyl records.

The track "Outer Space" is a downloadable song for the Rock Band series.

Reception 

AllMusic reviewer stated that "the album remade a case for Frehley as one of rock's most potent, soulful axe slingers", who "surprised even longtime supporters with its forceful, confident performances and sharp songwriting." Anomaly, wrote longtime Kiss supporter Geoff Barton, "is full of the Spaceman's signature charms: guitar playing that teeters on the brink of disintegration; gobby Bronx attitude; shout-it-out-loud vocals; songwriting skills that veer between brilliant and blundering. If Kiss's new album Sonic Boom is a slickly realised summation of the band's heritage, then Anomaly is the exact opposite: it's Ace at his most idiosyncratic, vulnerable, prankish, calamitous and, yes, cataclysmic." Justin Crafton of Sleaze Roxx.com reminded how the release of this album marks Frehley's 3rd year of sobriety and "features Ace at the top of his game, mentally, physically and musically."

Track listing

Other songs
Tracks recorded and/or not on the album
"Laurado"
"Skels" - Became "Space Bear"
"Hard for Me" - Became "Foxy & Free"
"Steamroller"
"The Pursuit of Rock 'n' Roll" - Later released on Frehley's 2018 album Spaceman
"The King Is Kong" - Became "Genghis Khan"

Personnel
 Ace Frehley – lead vocals, lead guitar, additional bass on tracks 2, 5, 9, 11, and 12
 Anthony Esposito – bass
 Anton Fig – drums, percussion on all tracks except 4, 10, and 12
 Derrek Hawkins – rhythm guitar on track 2
 Scot Coogan – drums, percussion on track 10, background vocals on 3 and 10
 Marti Frederiksen – keyboards, additional bass and rhythm guitar on 4 and 9, drums on 12, producer and engineer on track 4, mixing
 Brian Tichy – drums on track 4

Production
 Frank Munoz - associate producer 
 Jay Messina - engineer
 Bruce Somers - engineer on track 5
 Tim Hatfield - engineer on track 10
 Alex Salzman - engineer on tracks 9 and 12, overdubs engineer
 Rich Tozzoli - overdubs engineer
 Anthony Focx - mixing, digital editing, mastering

Charts

"Fox on the Run" reached #30 on the Billboard Heritage Rock Chart.

References 

2009 albums
Ace Frehley albums